The Chen Jing-lan Western House is a former house in Jinhu Township, Kinmen County, Taiwan. It is the largest Western-style house in Kinmen.

History
The house was originally built in 1917 by Chen Jing-lan, a local businessperson who built up his success in Singapore. A small section of the building was dedicated for his house. During World War II, the house was used as a military hospital. Eventually, the house was renovated and opened to public for exhibition.

Architecture
The house building as a total area of 1,590 m2 over two floors.

See also
 List of tourist attractions in Taiwan

References

1917 establishments in Taiwan
Buildings and structures in Kinmen County
Houses in Taiwan
Jinhu Township
Residential buildings completed in 1917